Ben Silvey (May 23, 1894 – February 7, 1948) was an American assistant director, producer  and production manager. He was nominated at the 6th Academy Awards for the short lived Best Assistant Director category.

Filmography

The Masked Dancer (1924) (assistant director)
Wedding Rings (1929) (assistant director)
The Song of the Flame (1930) (assistant director) 
Those Who Dance (1930) (assistant director)
Compromised (1931) (assistant director)
Advice to the Lovelorn (1933) (assistant director)
Blood Money (1933)
The Bowery (1933) (second unit director)
The King's Vacation (1933) (assistant director) 
Ladies They Talk About (1933) (assistant director)
The House of Rothschild (1934) (assistant director)
Kid Millions (1934) (assistant director)
The Last Gentleman (1934) (assistant director)
Cardinal Richelieu (1935) (assistant director)
Clive of India (1935) (assistant director)
Thanks a Million (1935) (assistant director)
It Had to Happen (1936) (assistant director)
One in a Million (1936) (assistant producer)
Under Two Flags (1936) (unit manager)
Second Honeymoon (1937) (assistant to the producer)
Thin Ice (1937) (assistant producer)
Rebecca of Sunnybrook Farm (1938) (assistant producer)
Straight Place and Show (1938) (assistant to the producer)
Three Blind Mice (1938) (assistant to the producer)
Jesse James (1939) (associate producer)
Stanley and Livingstone (1939) (assistant producer)
The Return of Frank James (1940) (production manager)
Sun Valley Serenade (1941) (production manager)
Western Union (1941) (unit manager)
Lifeboat (1944) (production manager)
The Spider (1945) (assistant producer)
Within These Walls (1945) (producer)
The Ghost and Mrs. Muir (1947) (production manager)
The Snake Pit (1948) (production manager)

References

External links
 
 

1894 births
1948 deaths
People from New York (state)
American film directors
American film producers
Assistant directors
Unit production managers